Baron Francis Bonaert (7 September 1914 – 15 June 2012) was a Belgian architect.

Biography
Francis Bonaert was born in Kortrijk, Belgium, and died in Brussels. Initially he pursued classical studies in Latin and Greek at Maredsous Abbey, until 1933. While at Maredsous he started taking photographs under the guidance of Father Attout OSB using a Leica (Leitz). An interest in shape and form led him to study architecture at the Institut Saint-Luc, in Brussels, from which he graduated in 1940.

In 1941 he studied modern architecture under the architect Stanislas Jasinski. He developed plans for a museum where light comes gradually from above as one moves upwards in the building. The plans were not executed, but used the same ideas as those that gave birth to the Guggenheim Museum in New York City.

During World War II, he returned to work as a photographer to avoid working as an architect for the Germans. During this period he was influenced by Edmond Moulu, who was making photos of Orval Abbey on new Gevalux paper, and applied this technique to two types of subject: portrait and scenery. He also worked in 1942–43 under the supervision of the architect Oscar Goffart, where he was trained in attention to detail in design.

After the war, he opened his own office in Brussels.

Work
Bonaert worked in four main areas:

 He built a few modern buildings as exemplified by the Benelux pavilion at Expo '58,  in Brussels.
 Under the influence of a titled book Early Homes depicting colonial houses in the United States, he started building private villas.
 Later, he moved to building villas of more classical inspiration and in the Flemish farm style.
 Finally, he restored many protected monuments, especially castles and some churches. In this area his most impressive work was the restoration of Duras Castle, Vêves Castle, Castle of Freÿr.

References

External links 
Website with information on buildings created by Francis Bonaert

1914 births
2012 deaths
20th-century Belgian architects
People from Kortrijk